Dreadnought Point is a prominent rocky point on the west side of Croft Bay, James Ross Island. It was surveyed by the Falkland Islands Dependencies Survey in August 1953. The UK Antarctic Place-Names Committee name is descriptive; the appearance of the feature is reminiscent of the bows of the early ironclads (battleships), also known as "dreadnoughts".

References 

Headlands of James Ross Island